Argophyllum laxum is a species of shrub that is endemic to the south of Grande Terre, New Caledonia, where it occurs in dense rainforests and maquis.

References

Argophyllaceae
Plants described in 1906
Flora of New Caledonia